The Old Rock House is a historic house in Harpersville, Alabama. It was added to the National Register of Historic Places on March 29, 2006. It is located 1 mile southeast of Harpersville at the end of a farm lane on the northern side of U.S. Route 280. The house is built of local grey granite and limestone. The house was previously listed on the Historic American Buildings Survey. The Old Rock House is the only surviving example of an early stone dwelling in Alabama.

See also
National Register of Historic Places listings in Alabama

Gallery

References

Houses on the National Register of Historic Places in Alabama
National Register of Historic Places in Shelby County, Alabama
Stone houses in the United States
Properties on the Alabama Register of Landmarks and Heritage
Houses in Shelby County, Alabama